The 2016 Brisbane Broncos season is the 29th in the club's history. Coached by Wayne Bennett, and captained by Corey Parker, they compete in the NRL's 2016 Telstra Premiership. Prior to the start of the Premiership season, the Broncos competed in the 2016 Auckland Nines, finishing last in their pool. During the mid-season 2016 State of Origin series six Broncos players were selected for Queensland.

Season summary

Milestones
Round 1: Greg Eden made his first grade debut
Round 1: James Roberts made his debut for the club.
Round 3: Jarrod Wallace played his 50th career game.
Round 7: Joe Ofahengaue Scored his 1st career try.
Round 8: Herman Ese'ese made his debut for the club
Round 9: Darius Boyd played his 100th game for the club.
Round 10: Jai Arrow made his first grade debut.
Round 10: Ben Hunt played his 150th career game.
Round 12: Greg Eden scored his 1st career try.
Round 12: Tevita Pangai Junior made his first grade debut.
Round 12: Jaydn Su'A made his first grade debut.
Round 13: Tevita Pangai Junior scored his first career try.
Round 16: Tom Opacic made his first grade debut.
Round 21: Tom Opacic scored his 1st career try,
Round 23: Jonus Pearson made his first grade debut.
Round 23: Jonus Pearson scored his 1st and 2nd career tries.
Round 25: Jai Arrow scored his 1st career try.
Round 25: Matt Gillett played his 150th career game.
Round 25: Anthony Milford played his 50th career game for the club.
Round 25: Sam Thaiday played his 250th career game.
Semi-Final: Corey Parker played his final career game.

Squad List

Squad Movement

Gains

Losses

Re-signings

Contract lengths

Ladder

Fixtures

Pre-season

NRL Auckland Nines

The NRL Auckland Nines is a pre-season rugby league nines competition featuring all 16 NRL clubs. The 2016 competition wias played over two days on 6 and 7 February at Eden Park. The Broncos featured in the Hunua pool and played the Warriors, Bulldogs and Sea Eagles.

World Club Series

Regular season

Finals

Statistics

Source:

Representatives

The following players have played a representative match in 2016.

Honours

League
Peter Frilingos Memorial Award for Headline Moment of the Year: Anthony Milford
Dally M Second-Rower of the Year: Matt Gillett

Club
Shane Webcke Award (Best Forward): Sam Thaiday
Allan Langer Award (Best Back): Darius Boyd
Kevin Walters Award (Most Consistent): Matt Gillett
Players' Player: Anthony Milford
Paul Morgan Medal (Player of the Year): Darius Boyd

References

Brisbane Broncos seasons
Brisbane Broncos season